Royal Air Force Needs Oar Point or more simply RAF Needs Oar Point is a former Royal Air Force advanced landing ground located near Lymington in Hampshire, England.  Constructed in 1943 it was used from April 1944 as a base for Hawker Typhoon fighter-bomber squadrons of No. 146 Wing of the 2nd Tactical Air Force supporting the Normandy landings. All four operational squadrons moved to RAF Hurn for two weeks before moving on to France by July 1944 and the airfield was returned to agricultural use in 1945.

Units and aircraft
No. 193 Squadron RAF with Hawker Typhoon IBs from 11 April to 3 July 1944.
No. 197 Squadron RAF with Hawker Typhoon IBs from 10 April 1944 to 3 July 1944.
No. 257 Squadron RAF with Hawker Typhoon IBs from 10 April 1944 to 2 July 1944
No. 266 Squadron RAF with Hawker Typhoon IBs from 10 April 1944 to 29 June 1944; it temporarily moved to RAF Snaith in Yorkshire between 27 April 1944 and 6 May 1944.
No. 413 (Polish) Repair and Salvage Unit was based on the airfield between 19 June 1944 and 21 July 1944.
No. 1318 Mobile Wing RAF Regiment
No. 2898 Squadron RAF Regiment

References
Citations

Bibliography

External links

Royal Air Force stations of World War II in the United Kingdom
Military units and formations established in 1943
Military units and formations disestablished in 1945
Royal Air Force stations in Hampshire
1943 establishments in England
1945 disestablishments in England